Novacaine was an American rock music group, formed in 1996 in Santa Monica, California, United States. In the late 1980s, David Hallyday had some success with his first solo records, but was unhappy. He decided to quit music, planning to do something different. But he had the idea to reform his high-school garage band, Blind Fish. Then, with his friend Erik Godal, he formed Novacaine, a kind of surf-grunge band who had some success in the US. They toured and started to get some Top 40 radio play. But at the same time, Hallyday began writing for the European market because their label, Mercury Records asked him to write some songs in French. He made some demos and began a new and successful solo career in France. Then Novacaine was in status-quo, Hallyday saying that a new album was in the works for 2000. After several years, he worked with producer Paul Reeve. In 2004 and Nova 6, was born. Meanwhile, Erik Godal joined up with the LA surf-noir band The Blue Hawaiians. Together they scored music for the hit TV show SpongeBob SquarePants. Besides The Blue Hawaiians, Godal continued to score for film and TV and was nominated for the 2006 Annie award for his work on Squirrelboy. Other films he scored include the Sundance film Subject Two and What Love Is. Godal also continued to work with Hallyday on his solo album Revelation, touring dates and producing some songs for Johnny Hallyday, Tina Arena and Cylia.

Personnel
 David Hallyday (real name David Smet) : vocals, guitar, drums (1996–1999)
 Erik Godal : guitar, keyboards, producer (1996–1999)
 Phil Gough : guitar (1996–1999)
 Bill Bieschke : bass guitar (1996–1999)

Discography

Studio albums
Novacaine  (1997)

External links
Novacaine at Last.fm
Official website for David Hallyday
Official website for Erik Godal

Rock music groups from California
Musical groups established in 1996
Musical groups disestablished in 1999
1996 establishments in California
1999 disestablishments in California
Surf music groups
Mercury Records artists